Tommy Cooper: Not Like That, Like This is a 2014 television film, made by Left Bank Pictures, about British comedian Tommy Cooper.

Plot
The film focuses on the life of the late Tommy Cooper, the popular British comedian, and the dilemma he faced when he fell in love with his assistant Mary Kay. At the time he was married to Gwen, whom he affectionately nicknamed Dove. Tommy was unable to choose between the two women and embarked upon a dual relationship that would last for 17 years. Cooper died during a live TV recording of Live from Her Majesty's in front of millions of television viewers on 15 April 1984.

Cast

 David Threlfall as Tommy Cooper
 Helen McCrory as Mary Kay
 Amanda Redman as Gwen 'Dove' Cooper
 Gregor Fisher as Miff Ferrie
 Andy Rush as Tom Cooper Jr.
 Paul Ritter as Eric Sykes
 Bob Golding as Eric Morecambe
 Jordan Metcalfe as Les Dennis
 Jason Manford as Ken Brooke
 Albie Marber as Tom Cooper Jr. (as a child)
 Tilly Vosburgh as Sheila
 David Sterne as Billy Mayo
 Andrew Harrison as David Bell
 Jacinta Mulcahy as The Queen
 James Carcaterra as Dustin Gee

References

External links
 

2014 television films
2014 films
Biographical television films
British television films